João Inácio Müller, O.F.M. (born 15 June 1960) is a Brazilian Roman Catholic archbishop.

Ordained to the priesthood on 3 December 1988, Müller was named as the bishop of Lorena, Brazil on 25 September 2013. On 5 May 2019, he was appointed as the Archbishop of Campinas.

References 

1960 births
Living people
People from Rio Grande do Sul
21st-century Roman Catholic bishops in Brazil
Roman Catholic archbishops of Campinas
Roman Catholic bishops of Lorena